Colchester United Football Club is an English football club based in Colchester, Essex. Formed in 1937, the club competed in the Southern Football League from their foundation until 1950, when they were elected to the Football League. The club spent eleven years in the Third Division South and Third Division following the league's reorganisation in 1958, with a best finish of third place in 1957, one point behind rivals Ipswich Town and Torquay United. Colchester suffered their first relegation in 1961 as they finished 23rd in the Third Division, but spent just one season in the Fourth Division as they were promoted in second position, behind Millwall by just one point. This trend of relegation followed by promotion continued over the next few decades, before the club were eventually relegated from the Football League to the Conference in 1990.

Player-manager Roy McDonough guided the club back to the Football League in 1992, winning the non-league double of the Conference title and the FA Trophy. The club then won promotion to the Second Division in 1998 with a 1–0 Third Division play-off Final win at Wembley against Torquay United. The club were again earned promotion in the 2005–06 season under the stewardship of Phil Parkinson, gaining the opportunity to play second-tier football for the first time in their history. After two seasons in the Championship, Colchester were relegated back to League One, where they currently play.

This list encompasses all major honours won by Colchester United, the records set by the managers, the players, and the club. The player records section includes details of the club's leading goalscorers and those who have made most appearances in first-team competitions, alongside the record transfer fees paid and received by the club, and the fee progression. Attendance records at Colchester's Layer Road and Colchester Community Stadium are also included in the list.

Honours
Colchester United have won one major honour in the Football League, winning the Third Division play-off final in the 1997–98 season, when they defeated Torquay United 1–0 at Wembley after finishing fourth in the league, one point away from automatic promotion. They have achieved promotion on six other occasions, most recently in 2005–06, when they finished as runners-up in League One to Southend United, thus earning promotion to the Championship for the first time in their history.

Colchester United's honours and achievements include the following:

The Football League
League One (level 3)
Promotion: 2005–06
Fourth Division / Third Division (level 4)
Promotion: 1961–62, 1965–66, 1973–74, 1976–77, 1997–98

Football Conference
Conference (level 5)
Champions: 1991–92

Southern Football League
Southern League
Champions: 1938–39

Domestic cup competition
Football League Trophy
Finalists: 1996–97
FA Trophy
Winners: 1991–92
Watney Cup
Winners: 1971–72

Player records

Appearances
 Youngest first-team debut: Lindsay Smith, 16 years 214 days (vs. Grimsby Town, Fourth Division, 20 April 1971)
 Oldest first-team debut: Bob Gregg, 41 years, 272 days (vs. Wisbech Town, Southern League, 3 November 1945)
 Oldest Football League first-team debut: Teddy Sheringham, 41 years, 131 days (vs. Sheffield United, Championship, 11 August 2007)

Most appearances
Competitive matches only.

Goalscorers

 Most goals (league): Martyn King, 131 (1959–1965)
 Most goals (all competitions): Tony Adcock, 149 (1981–1987, 1995–1998)
 Most goals in a season (league): Bobby Hunt, 37 (1961–62)
 Most goals in a season (all competitions): Arthur Pritchard, 44 (1938–38)
 Most goals in a league match scored: Chris Iwelumo (vs. Hull City, 2006), Bobby Hunt (vs. Doncaster Rovers, 1962 & vs. Bradford City, 1961), Martyn King (vs. Bradford City, 1961), 4 goals
 Top scorer with fewest goals in a season: Steve Foley, 7 (1975–76)
 Most hat-tricks: 5, Arthur Pritchard (18 September 1937 – 1 April 1939), Arthur Turner (9 November 1946 – 10 March 1949), Martyn King (26 September 1959 – 10 November 1962), Tony Adcock (21 January 1983 – 26 September 1995)

Overall scorers

Players shown in bold are current Colchester United players and statistics will be subject to change.

Last updated 2 June 2011

Award winners

PFA Team of the Year
The following players have been included in the PFA Team of the Year while playing for Colchester United:
 Steve Dowman, 1977
 Lindsay Smith, 1977
 Roger Osborne, 1982
 Tony Adcock, 1985
 Mark Kinsella, 1996
 Neil Danns, 2006
 Greg Halford, 2006

Player of the Year and Seasonal Awards
The following players have been awarded the official Colchester United Player of the Year. Also included are seasonal top goalscorers and most overall appearances since the Player of the Year award's inception in 1965:

Internationals
 Most capped player (whilst at club): 7 Chris Coyne, (Australia)
 Most capped player (whole career): 56 Craig Forrest, (Canada)

Transfers

Highest transfer fees paid

Progression of record fee paid

Highest transfer fees received

Progression of record fee received

Managers
The following list indicates Colchester United managers since 1937:

Team records

Matches
 First competitive match: Yeovil & Petters United 3–0 Colchester United, Southern League, 28 August 1937
 First FA Cup match: Colchester United 4–1 Ilford, FA Cup 4th Qualifying Round, 12 November 1938
 First Football League match: Gillingham 0–0 Colchester United, Third Division South, 19 August 1950
 First League Cup match: Colchester United 4–1 Newcastle United, League Cup 1st Round, 10 October 1960

Record wins
 Record league win: Colchester United 9–1 Bradford City, Fourth Division, 30 December 1961
 Record cup win: Colchester United 9–1 Leamington, FA Cup 1st Round, 5 November 2005
 Record home win: Colchester United 9–1 Bradford City, Fourth Division, 30 December 1961
 Record away win: Norwich City 1–7 Colchester United, League One, 8 August 2009

Record defeats
 Record league defeat: Leyton Orient 8–0 Colchester United, Fourth Division, 15 October 1988
 Record cup defeat: Preston North End 7–0 Colchester United, FA Cup 3rd Round, 2 January 2010
 Record home defeat:
 Colchester United 0–5 Luton Town, Division Two, 21 April 2003
 Colchester United 0–5 Norwich City, League One, 16 January 2010
 Colchester United 1–6 Stevenage F.C, League One, 26 December 2011
 Record away defeat: Leyton Orient 8–0 Colchester United, Fourth Division, 15 October 1988

Sequences

Full league sequence
 Longest winning streak: 7 matches
 29 November 1968 – 1 February 1969
 31 December 2005 – 7 February 2006
 Longest drawing streak: 6 matches, 21 March 1977 – 11 April 1977
 Longest losing streak: 9 matches
 21 November 2012 – 12 January 2013
 31 October 2015 – 28 December 2015
 Longest clean sheet streak: 8 matches, 7 March 1992 – 22 April 1992
 Longest streak failing to score: 5 matches
 7 April 1981 – 25 April 1981
 21 April 2003 – 15 August 2003
 11 February 2006 – 11 March 2006
 Longest streak without a win: 20 matches, 2 March 1968 – 31 August 1968
 Longest streak without a draw: 24 matches, 16 October 1976 – 19 March 1977
 Longest streak without a loss: 20 matches, 22 December 1956 – 19 April 1957
 Longest streak without a clean sheet: 38 matches, 1 September 2007 – 29 March 2008
 Longest streak without failing to score: 26 matches, 30 April 1991 – 1 January 1992

Home league sequences
Longest winning streak: 17 matches, 12 October 1991 – 15 August 1992
Longest drawing streak: 5 matches
 26 December 1977 – 25 February 1978
 15 April 1978 – 2 September 1978
 13 March 2012 – 14 April 2012
Longest losing streak: 6 matches, 13 October 1989 – 16 December 1989
Longest clean sheet streak: 9 matches, 1 January 1992 – 20 April 1992
Longest streak failing to score: 4 matches, 14 March 2009 – 25 April 2009
Longest streak without a win: 11 matches, 2 March 1968 – 31 August 1968
Longest streak without a draw: 27 matches, 26 September 1989 – 3 November 1990
Longest streak without a loss: 27 matches, 14 April 1956 – 2 September 1957
Longest streak without a clean sheet: 23 matches, 9 April 2007 – 18 March 2008
Longest streak without failing to score: 33 matches, 21 April 1984 – 18 October 1985

Away league sequences
Longest winning streak: 5 matches
 11 October 1981 – 28 November 1981
 3 October 1987 – 6 November 1987
 26 December 2022 – 11 February 2023 (Gillingham, Harrogate Town, Rochdale, Hartlepool, Grimsby)
Longest drawing streak: 5 matches, 21 March 1977 – 22 April 1977
Longest losing streak: 12 matches, 12 March 1960 – 15 October 1960
Longest clean sheet streak: 4 matches, 27 March 1978 – 24 April 1978
Longest streak failing to score: 7 matches
 28 February 1978 – 22 April 1978
 12 March 1988 – 2 September 1988
 22 November 2003 – 13 March 2004
Longest streak without a win: 19 matches
 13 September 1950 – 21 April 1951
 26 December 1959 – 29 October 1960
Longest streak without a draw: 17 matches, 21 February 1959 – 6 October 1959
Longest streak without a loss: 11 matches, 24 August 1991 – 14 December 1991
Longest streak without a clean sheet: 33 matches, 19 September 2007 – 12 January 2009
Longest streak without failing to score: 16 matches, 18 August 1962 – 27 March 1963

Footnotes

A.  The "Other" column constitutes goals and appearances (including those as a substitute) in the Football League Trophy or Associate Members Cup, FA Trophy, Conference League Cup, Southern League Cup and Watney Cup.
B.  Does not include football played during war years (1939–40 to 1945–46).

References

Colchester United
Records and Statistics